2018 Mito HollyHock season.

Squad
As of 30 January 2018.

Out on loan

J2 League

References

External links
 J.League official site

Mito HollyHock
Mito HollyHock seasons